Kauslers Island is an island in Plum Creek, near Lake Erie. It is in Monroe County, Michigan.

See also
Foleys Island
Smiths Island

References

Islands of Monroe County, Michigan